Psychroflexus is a psychrophilic bacteria genus from the family of Flavobacteriaceae.

References

Further reading 
 
 
 
 

Flavobacteria
Bacteria genera
Psychrophiles